The French National Badminton Championships is a tournament organized to crown the best badminton players in France.

The tournament started in 1950 and is held every year.

Past winners

References
Badminton Europe - France

Badminton tournaments in France
Recurring sporting events established in 1950
1950 establishments in France
National badminton championships